In the x86 assembly programming language, MOVHPD is the name for a specific action performable by modern x86 processors with 2nd-generation Streaming SIMD Extensions (SSE2). This action involves either copying a number from memory to temporary space  or copying a number from temporary space to memory.

Specifically, MOVHPD causes the value at an 8-byte memory region to be either copied to or assigned from the upper half of an XMM register.

Usage

The source operand can be either an XMM register (xmm) or a memory address (m64). When the source operand is an XMM register, the destination operand must be a memory address. When the source operand is a memory address, the destination operand must be an XMM register.

Note that the lower half of the XMM register is unaffected by this operation.

Potential exceptions

References
  page.
Intel 64 and IA-32 Architectures Software Developer's Manual Volume 2A: Instruction Set Reference, A-M, November, 2006.

See also
MOVAPS/MOVAPD
MOVDDUP
MOVHLPS
MOVHPS/MOVHPD
MOVLHPS
MOVLPS/MOVLPD
MOVMSKPS/MOVMSKPD
MOVNTPS
MOVSHDUP
MOVSLDUP
MOVSS/MOVSD
MOVUPS/MOVUPD

x86 instruction listings

X86 instructions